"Remind Me to Forget" is a song recorded by Norwegian record producer Kygo, featuring guest vocals from American singer Miguel. Written by David Phelan, Alex Oriet, Phil Plested and produced by Kygo, it was released on 16 March 2018 by Sony Music, Ultra Music and RCA Records, as the third and final single from Kygo's second studio album, Kids in Love (2017). The song was featured in the movie trailer for the 2019 film, Five Feet Apart.

Release and composition
On 8 March 2018, a short clip of the song first surfaced on the internet. On 10 March 2018, Kygo announced the song on Instagram and Facebook with a series of promotional photos. "Remind Me to Forget" is a midtempo electro, tropical house and R&B track about "learning to let go of a love lost".

Critical reception
Shanté Honeycutt of Billboard noted the song's potential to become "a summer dance jam", regarding it as a memorable song despite the title, writing: "Kygo's lighthearted production is a match for Miguel's powerhouse vocals". Kevin Goddard of HotNewHipHop called the song "another strong addition to both artist's growing catalog of hits", writing that it features an "uptempo and infectious dance-friendly production from Kygo", on which "Miguel shows off his vocals". Similarly, Essences Rachaell Davis wrote that "the song features Miguel delivering his signature vocals over an infectious beat". Artistdirect deemed the song a mixture of Kygo's "upbeat tropical house sound" and "Miguel's seductive and sultry vocals", resulting in "an endlessly-playable melody". Rap-Up described the collaboration as "dance floor-ready", on which Miguel's "soothing" vocals are backed by "Kygo's melodic, pulsing instrumental". Karlie Powell of Your EDM opined that the song "bridges the gap between EDM and mainstream", as the two artists "play off each other's styles for a straight up unforgettable result".

Music video
The Colin Tilley-directed music video for "Remind Me to Forget" was released on 6 May 2018 on Kygo's official YouTube channel. It features Miguel, a piano-playing Kygo, and a female ballerina performing in separate rooms of a house during some kind of cataclysm, with walls and furnishings being destroyed by unseen forces.

Live performances
On 14 May 2018, Kygo and Miguel performed the song live on The Tonight Show Starring Jimmy Fallon.

Credits and personnel
Credit adapted from Tidal.
 Kygo – production
 David Phelan – composition
 Alex Oriet – composition
 Phil Plested – composition
 Serban Ghenea – mix engineering
 Randy Merrill – master engineering
 John Hanes – engineering

Charts

Weekly charts

Year-end charts

Certifications

Release history

References

External links
 

2018 singles
2018 songs
Kygo songs
Miguel (singer) songs
Contemporary R&B ballads
Contemporary R&B songs
Electro songs
Pop ballads
RCA Records singles
Song recordings produced by Kygo
Sony Music singles
Ultra Music singles